Burton Orange Longyear (1868–1969) was an American botanist, forester, and mycologist, specializing in the fungi of Michigan. He was also a gem cutter.

Biography
Born on a farm in Ingham County, Michigan, Burton Longyear moved, at the age of 18, with his parents and brother to Mason, Michigan, the county seat of Ingham County. He clerked in a pharmacy owned by his brother and eventually became a registered pharmacist. In 1890 he enrolled to study botany and chemistry at the State Agricultural College of Michigan, which was renamed Michigan Agricultural College in 1909 and Michigan State University in 1964. At the State Agricultural College, he became in 1893 an instructor of botany and later was employed there for two years as United States Experiment Station Botanist. As a special student at the State Agricultural College, he graduated with a Bachelor of Science degree in 1903.

In 1904 he became an instructor in botany and horticulture at Colorado Agricultural College (CAC), which was renamed Colorado State College of Agriculture and Mechanic Arts in 1935 and Colorado State University in 1957. In 1909 he became head of the newly established department of botany and forestry at CAC. From 1912 to 1915 he served as State Forester of Colorado (a newly created position) but then returned to teaching botany. At CAC he became am associate professor of forestry and held that position until he retired in 1936. He received a master's degree in forestry from Michigan Agricultural College in 1925. During his career he published many bulletins and articles.

On 29 December 1897 Burton O. Longyear married Jessie L. Bond (1870–1953). They had several children.

Selected publications

Bulletins

Books

References

External links

1868 births
1969 deaths
19th-century American botanists
20th-century American botanists
American centenarians
Men centenarians
Michigan State University alumni
Colorado State University faculty
People from Leslie, Michigan